During the 1998–99 English football season, Brentford competed in the Football League Third Division. The club finished the season as champions after victory over runners-up Cambridge United on the final day.

Season summary

After relegation to the Third Division at the end of the previous season, the ownership of Brentford changed hands for the second time in two summers, when Ron Noades took over the club as owner and chairman during the 1998 off-season. Noades installed himself as manager and appointed a three-man coaching team of Ray Lewington, Terry Bullivant and Brian Sparrow. Nearly £1.5 million was spent to assemble almost an entirely new starting lineup, with goalkeeper Jason Pearcey, defenders Danny Boxall, Darren Powell, Rob Quinn and Hermann Hreiðarsson (the club's then-record £750,000 signing), midfielders Martin Rowlands and Tony Folan and forwards Lloyd Owusu and Darren Freeman added to the ranks.

9 wins in the opening 13 league matches put the Bees firmly in control at the top of the table, though three successive defeats in the midst of the run temporarily dropped the club back to 7th place. There was some early-season excitement in the League Cup, with a 4–2 aggregate victory over First Division club West Bromwich Albion in the first round setting up a two-legged tie with Premier League club Tottenham Hotspur. 3–2 defeats in each of the two legs (with Brentford taking the lead in both matches) ended the cup run, with memorable goals being scored by Andy Scott, Darren Freeman and Lloyd Owusu.

Three league defeats in a four-match spell in November and injuries and suspensions to Andy Scott, Darren Powell, Danny Boxall, Jamie Bates and Martin Rowlands led Noades to further strengthen the squad with forward Leo Fortune-West and midfielder Gavin Mahon. Though Fortune-West would be sold on a matter of months later, Mahon replaced Warren Aspinall in midfield and remained an ever-present until the end of the season. Five wins in the following six league matches saw the club begin 1999 firmly placed in the automatic promotion places. A spell of just one win from a spell of seven league matches in January and February saw Noades reach for the chequebook again and sign forward Scott Partridge from Torquay United for £100,000.

With the purchase of new captain Paul Evans and buoyed by the goalscoring of Partridge and Owusu, the Bees went undefeated from late February through to early May. The club secured automatic promotion back to the Second Division with two matches to spare after a 3–0 victory over Exeter City on 1 May. A resounding 4–1 win over Swansea City in the following match returned Brentford to the top of the table for the first time since 20 October 1998. The victory set up a "winner takes all" match for the title on the final day at the Abbey Stadium versus nearest challengers Cambridge United. Lloyd Owusu's 25th goal of the season was enough for victory and for Brentford to win the Third Division championship.

League table

Results
Brentford's goal tally listed first.

Legend

Pre-season

Football League Third Division

FA Cup

Football League Cup

Football League Trophy

 Sources: Soccerbase, 11v11, Brentford Official Matchday Magazine

Playing squad 
Players' ages are as of the opening day of the 1998–99 season.

 Source: Soccerbase

Coaching staff

Statistics

Appearances and goals
Substitute appearances in brackets.

 Players listed in italics left the club mid-season.
 Source: Soccerbase

Goalscorers 

 Players listed in italics left the club mid-season.
 Source: Soccerbase

Discipline

 Players listed in italics left the club mid-season.
 Source: Soccerbase

International caps

Management

Summary

Transfers & loans

Kit

|
|

Awards 
 Supporters' Player of the Year: Darren Powell
 Football League Third Division PFA Team of the Year: Paul Evans, Hermann Hreiðarsson
 Football League Third Division Manager of the Month: Ron Noades (August 1998)
 League Managers Association Performance of the Week: Ron Noades (Brentford 3–0 West Bromwich Albion, League Cup first round, second leg, 18 August 1998)

Notes

References

Brentford F.C. seasons
Brentford